Robert Bruce Johnson (August 18, 1875 – October 16, 1932) was a Republican member of the Wisconsin Senate, representing the 25th District from 1927 to 1931. He resided in Superior, Wisconsin.

References

Republican Party Wisconsin state senators
1875 births
1932 deaths
Politicians from Superior, Wisconsin